Allen Branch is a stream in St. Francois County, Missouri. It is a tributary of Doe Run Creek.

Allen Branch has the name of the original owner of the site.

Course
Allen Branch rises about 0.25 miles north of Buck Mountain in St. Francois County, Missouri, and then flows northeast to join Doe Run Creek about 2 miles south of Doe Run.

Watershed
Allen Branch drains  of area, receives about 44.5 in/year of precipitation, has a wetness index of 435.49, and is about 89% forested.

See also
List of rivers of Missouri

References

Rivers of St. Francois County, Missouri
Rivers of Missouri
Lower Mississippi water resource region